Philemon Omondi Otieno (born 18 October 1992) is a Kenyan footballer who plays as a midfielder for Gor Mahia and the Kenya national team.

International career
Otieno made his debut for Kenya on 25 May 2018 against Swaziland.

Career statistics

International
Statistics accurate as of match played 14 October 2018

Honours 
Kenyan Premier League: winner (2017, 2018)

References

External links
 

1992 births
Living people
Kenyan footballers
Kenya international footballers
Association football midfielders
Ushuru F.C. players
Gor Mahia F.C. players
Kenyan Premier League players
2019 Africa Cup of Nations players